John Christopher Strong (born July 22, 1974) is an American actor, composer, and musician. He is best known for his roles in Black Hawk Down (as Medal of Honor recipient Randy Shughart) and The Fast and the Furious as Leon. Aside from acting, Strong is also the lead vocalist and founder of the band Operator, movie composer, movie writer and movie producer.

Early life and education
Strong was born in Los Angeles County, California. At the age of 7 he began studying martial arts, taking up Judo in the San Fernando Valley. He went on to learn Kickboxing, Jeet Kune Do, Boxing, and eventually earned a black belt in Brazilian jiu-jitsu under Chris Lisciandro. At 12, he began to play guitar and taught himself to play drums, bass, and piano.

Career

Music
He was signed to two major labels RCA and Atlantic Records. He has released nine albums: Bombthreat: Before She Blows and Fly and Lick My Neck Good Sleep with his former band, and Can You Hear Me Now?, La Luna Del Diablo Blanco, Soulcrusher, The War of Art,  Close to Extinction,  War Horse and White Light with Operator band.

Film
Strong has had various roles in television, and landed a role in the Steven Seagal film The Glimmer Man. He then worked on Sylvester Stallone's Get Carter, The Fast and The Furious, and Black Hawk Down. Strong stars in Sinners & Saints, a New Orleans-based police thriller featuring Sean Patrick Flanery and Tom Berenger released in 2012.

2010 marked his return to the screen, starring in Sinners and Saints, an action-thriller film, as Detective Sean Riley.

Personal life 
He was married on December 10, 1997, to Alexandra Holden, but they have since divorced.

Filmography

References

External links

 
 

1974 births
American male film actors
American rock singers
Living people
Male actors from Los Angeles
Singers from Los Angeles
American stunt performers
American martial artists
American Jeet Kune Do practitioners
American practitioners of Brazilian jiu-jitsu
American male kickboxers
American male boxers
American male judoka
21st-century American singers